Hebei Normal University of Science and Technology (河北科技师范学院 Héběi kējì shīfàn xuéyuàn) is a university in Hebei, China under the provincial government.

Established in 1941, Hebei Normal University of Science and Technology started the undergraduates program in 1977. In 1999, HNUST was authorized by China Ministry of Education as one of the first key bases for training teachers of vocational education. In 2003, it was renamed as Hebei Normal University of Science and Technology.

There are 21 educational departments. 44 undergraduate specialties and 59 technological studies are run at the school, covering disciplines of Agriculture, Engineering, Arts, Science, Law, Economy, Management and Education and four disciplines are authorized to grant master's degrees. Hebei Normal University of Science and Technology adheres to integrating production, education and research to facilitate the practical transformation of scientific research of fruits and to fully display the advantages of agricultural specialty. Since the 11th five-year National Developing Program, the University has successfully bred 29 new species with own property rights, and won 11 provincial awards for scientific progress. One of them is YanLong, a new Chinese chestnut a new tomato species both funded by national funding for production transformation.

Universities and colleges in Hebei
Teachers colleges in China
Educational institutions established in 1941
1941 establishments in China